Neurath Power Station is a lignite-fired power station at Neurath in Grevenbroich, North Rhine-Westphalia, Germany.  It is located to the south of Grevenbroich, and it borders the municipalities of Rommerskirchen and Bedburg.  The power station consists of seven units and it is owned by RWE. It was named as the second biggest single polluter for carbon dioxide emissions in the European Union in 2019 by the EU's Transport and Environment Group, as well as the 102nd biggest polluting asset globally by Climate TRACE.

Description 

The Neurath Power Station serves mainly as a base load power station.  It consists of seven units (3 x 300 MW, 2 x 600 MW, and 2 x 1,100 MW nominally).  Five older units were built between 1972 and 1976, and have a gross generation capacity of 2,200 MW.  On 15 August 2012 two new 1,100 MW lignite-fired units – F and G, also known as BoA 2 and 3 – were added. BoA stands for Braunkohlekraftwerk mit optimierter Anlagentechnik (Lignite power station with optimized systems technology). The new units have an efficiency of 43% and the capability to adjust quickly to changes in energy demand. Both of the new units are 170 m (558 ft) tall which makes them amongst the tallest industrial buildings in the world, possibly second only to the powerblock at the Niederaussem Power Station. Its engineering was carried out by Alstom, which was also the supplier of the steam turbines. The consortium that supplied steam generators was led by Babcock-Hitachi Europe GmbH. GEA Group built the cooling towers. Construction costs were €2.6 billion.

The lignite is delivered by rail from open pits in Rhenish lignite district, in particular from the Garzweiler and Hambach mines.

In the 1980s, a complete flue gas cleaning facility was installed for all blocks. The exhaust gases are derived since then over the cooling towers. They allow operating the facility in case of defunct flue gas cleaning facility, however, as this rarely occurs, such chimneys do not exist at most other power stations.

Note: Net nominal capacity has reduced since inauguration - the capacity listed above is current, not initial capacity (total 4,211 MW as of August, 2017)

Criticism 
The new power station is criticized in the climate change discussion by environmental associations and physical custodians, because electricity generation from lignite as fuel, in spite of advanced technology, is considerably less efficient than other generation sources and makes the plant the second biggest source of carbon dioxide among plants in EU. The facility, with a planned lifespan of 40 years, is seen as inconsistent with Germany's and Europe's plans to counter climate warming, particularly after COP21. According to Climate TRACE, the power station is the 102nd largest point-source emitter of greenhouse gas globally. 

It is criticized furthermore that the investment efficiency is not maximized by additional measures like using of waste heat. One of the suggested projects is the establishment of a wide greenhouse park to use the attacking rejected heat and to create other jobs. However, the area planned for it was planned for industries with large electricity demand.

Accidents 
In the evening of 25 October 2007, a major accident occurred on the construction site. A section of the scaffolding broke off, and buried several workers. Three construction workers were killed by the remains of the scaffold. Six others, who were seriously injured, were taken to surrounding hospitals.

Nearly 300 application forces from fire brigade, police, ambulances and technical charitable organization were used for the rescue operation. In December 2008, the initiated preliminary proceedings were put because of careless homicide by the public prosecutor's office of Mönchengladbach. According to certificate the knot connections of the scaffold were laid out too weakly. Because there has been no knowledge about them, in this size for the first time to used components and their stability problems, the accident has not foreseen for the experts, according to the public prosecutor's office. Rather interpretation and construction have occurred under the rules of the technology.

On 13 January 2008, a further deadly accident occurred in which an employee of a steel construction company was killed. After the above-mentioned accident in October 2007 and another accident in September 2007, this became the third deadly incident on the construction site.

See also
 List of tallest industrial buildings
 List of tallest cooling towers
 
 Niederaußem power station
 Ende Gelände 2017
 Ende Gelände 2019

References

External links 

 https://web.archive.org/web/20070928005653/http://www.rwe.com/generator.aspx/standorte/braunkohle/kraftwerke/neurath/language=de/id=9670/neurath-page.htm

Coal-fired power stations in Germany
RWE